The Civaux Nuclear Power Plant is located in the commune of Civaux (Vienne) at the edge of Vienne River between Confolens (60 km upstream) and Chauvigny (14 km downstream), and 44 km south-east of Poitiers.

It has two operating units that were the precursors to the European Pressurized Reactor, being the "N4 stage". Designed for a net power output of 1450 MWe per unit, power was uprated to 1500 MWe in 2010. The Civaux plant uses ambient air and water from the Vienne River for cooling.

As of 2022, 1300 people work at the plant.

The cooling towers of Civaux Nuclear Power Plant are 178 metres in height, which are the highest among those of EDF's nuclear power plants.

Events
On 12 May 1998 there was a leak on an elbow in a pipe of the RCS.  Water leaked out at the rate of 30 cubic meters per hour.  It was classified as an INES level-2 event.
Civaux was a proposed target in the 1998 World Cup terror plot; it was planned that Armed Islamic Group terrorists would crash a hijacked aeroplane into the plant on 15 June 1998. The plot was foiled with a mass arrest of conspirators on 26 May.

Reactors

See also

EDF
Pressurized Water Reactor
Chooz Nuclear Power Plant

References

Nuclear power stations in France
Buildings and structures in Vienne
2002 establishments in France